Suza is a settlement in the region of Baranja, Croatia. Administratively, it is located in the Kneževi Vinogradi municipality within the Osijek-Baranja County. Population is 636 people.

Ethnic groups (2001 census)
543 – Hungarians
35 – Croats
20 – Serbs
38 – others

References 

Kneževi Vinogradi